Intent  is an agent's specific purpose in performing an action or series of actions.

Intent may also refer to:

Computing and technology
 Intent (Android), an abstract description of an operation to be performed in the Android development environment
 Intent (software), Tao Group's software platform

Other uses
 Original intent, a theory of legal interpretation
 Intent (military), a capability in military doctrine

See also
 Goal (disambiguation)
 Intend (disambiguation)
 Intention (disambiguation)
 Mens rea
 Objective (disambiguation)
 Purpose (disambiguation)